Álvaro Gonzalo Gutiérrez Cueva (born 15 August 1964) is a Peruvian politician. He is a former Congressman representing Arequipa for the 2006–2011 period, and belongs to the Union for Peru party.

References

Living people
Union for Peru politicians
Members of the Congress of the Republic of Peru
1964 births